Federico Roman (born 29 July 1952) is an Italian equestrian and Olympic champion.

Biography
Federico Roman won an individual gold medal in eventing at the 1980 Summer Olympics in Moscow. He was also a member of the Italian team that received a silver medal in team eventing at the same Olympics. He participated also to 1976 Summer Olympics and 1992 Summer Olympics. He is the brother of Mauro Roman.

His sons Luca and Pietro competed together at the 2016 Summer Olympics in Rio de Janeiro, Brazil.

Olympic results

See also
 Italy at the 1980 Summer Olympics

References

External links
 
 
 
 

1952 births
Living people
Italian male equestrians
Italian event riders
Olympic equestrians of Italy
Olympic gold medalists for Italy
Olympic silver medalists for Italy
Olympic medalists in equestrian
Equestrians at the 1976 Summer Olympics
Equestrians at the 1980 Summer Olympics
Equestrians at the 1992 Summer Olympics
Medalists at the 1980 Summer Olympics